The 2004 Konica Minolta V8 Supercar Series was an Australian touring car series held for V8 Supercars. It was the fifth series held for second tier V8 Supercars. The season began on 22 February 2004 at Wakefield Park and finished on 22 August at Mallala Motor Sport Park. The season consisted of six rounds held across four different states, returning to Queensland for the first time since 2001.

The tightest series in the history of the second-tier V8 Supercar competition saw the point score tied at the end of the final race. Brad Jones Racing Ford driver, Andrew Jones was adjudged the series champion on a countback as he won Winton Motor Raceway and Eastern Creek Raceway rounds whereas rival Supercheap Auto Racing Ford driver Luke Youlden did not have a round win to his credit. The pointscore underlined the necessity of consistency in race results, Dick Johnson Racing Ford driver Owen Kelly took the most race wins for the season, seven in total, but did not figure in the final points, losing too many through poor results. Jones had two wins, Youlden just one. The remaining wins were scattered between Alan Gurr, Mal Rose, Lee Holdsworth, Kurt Wimmer and Wayne Wakefield, most of those through the benefit of reverse grid races with Greg Ritter taking two wins and the final round in a guest drive of the Speed FX Racing Falcon Brad Tilley had driven all season. New Zealander Mark Porter had his best series result (and also the best Holden), finishing third, 68 points behind the top two after taking one second and a pair of third during the season. José Fernández finished fourth in the series despite never finishing higher than fourth in a race.

Teams and drivers
The following teams and drivers have competed during the 2004 Konica Minolta V8 Supercar Series.

Race calendar

Results and standings
The season consisted of six rounds across three different states. Rounds 1 and 3–6 consisted of three races. The second race of each weekend saw the finishing order of race 1 reversed to form the grid, a 'reverse grid' race. Round 2 consisted of a pair of races. Points were awarded for all cars who finished each race in finishing order. Points may have been offered beyond the 30th position but at no point during the season did more than 30 cars finish a race. Round 2's pair of races carried 50% more points than a single race elsewhere in the season.

Drivers championship 
Points table referenced, in part, as follows:

References

External links
 2004 Konica Minolta V8 Supercar Series - Race Format & Points System, www.v8supercars.com.au, as archived at web.archive.org
 2004 race results, racing.natsoft.com.au > Circuit Racing > 2004
 2004 Konica Minolta V8 Supercar Series Points, www.v8supercars.com.au, as archived at web.archive.org
 2004 Konica Minolta V8 Supercar Series - Points Report, racing.natsoft.com.au, as archived at web.archive.org

See also
 2004 V8 Supercar season

Konica
Supercars Development Series